Chen Beibei (born February 11, 1980) is a television presenter for CCTV. She is from Jiujiang, Jiangxi, China. In 2002, she became a hostess after graduating from Communication University of China.

In 2005, she began to host financial informative program Time No.1. On April 16, 2013, she began to host interactive truth-seeking program Is It True.

Career 
In 2002, Chen Beibei practiced in program Live on CCTV-2 after graduating from Communication University of China. In 2003, she hosted Fine Living in Beijing on BTV-7.

In 2005, she began to host financial informative program Time No.1. She also hosted food program National Television Cooking Arena Match. After that, she hosted food program Food Guest with Zhu Yi. She also hosted program Shopping Street.

In October 2010, she hosted shopping program Fashion Shopping on CCTV-2.

Chen beibei hosts interactive truth-seeking program Is It True since April 16, 2013.

Personal life 
On August 8, 2011, Chen Beibei gave birth to her twin daughters.

Discography

Awards 
In November 2016, Chen Beibei won award "The Best Entertainment Hostess" of the 3rd Asia Rainbow TV Award.

References 

CCTV television presenters
1980 births
Living people
People from Jiujiang